Praterstern is a major square in the Leopoldstadt district of Vienna, Austria     .

The square features the column to Admiral Wilhelm von Tegetthoff.

Located and named after it are the Wien Praterstern railway station, and the connecting Praterstern (Vienna U-Bahn), on lines U1 and U2.

External links 

Squares in Vienna
Leopoldstadt